Tiphia minuta  is a Palearctic species of tiphiid wasp.

References

External links
Images representing  Tiphia minuta 

Hymenoptera of Europe
Tiphiidae
Insects described in 1827